The 1931 Fuyun earthquake (富蕴地震) occurred on August 10 at 21:18 UTC. The epicenter was near Fuyun County of northern Xinjiang, China. It was a  8.0 earthquake and had a surface rupture of 171 km with a maximal horizontal displacement of 14 m along the Koktokay-Ertai fault zone (可可托海-二台断裂带). The Koktokay-Ertai fault has a slip rate of 4±2 mm per year. The rupture of this earthquake was caused by right-lateral strike-slip movement with normal component. The rupture is well preserved and becomes one of the main features of the Koktokay National Geopark (可可托海国家地质公园) located in Koktokay.

See also 
 List of earthquakes in 1931
 List of earthquakes in China

References

External links 
 

1931 earthquakes
1931 in China 
1931 disasters in China
1931 Fuyun
August 1931 events
Earthquakes in Mongolia
1931 in Mongolia 
1931 disasters in Mongolia